Sometimes a Memory Ain't Enough is an album by Jerry Lee Lewis released on Mercury Records in 1973.

Background
The title song, "Sometimes a Memory Ain't Enough", was another Top 10 for Lewis, peaking at number 6 on the Billboard country singles chart on December 8, 1973 after 14 weeks on the chart.  Lewis gives committed performances, although producer Stan Kesler's growing penchant of sweetening the sound with strings and backing vocalists diluted some of the harder edges that were evident on Jerry Lee's earlier country albums like Another Place, Another Time and Touching Home. It kept Lewis competitive on the radio, however, and the Stan Kesler-penned title track rose to number 6. Although Lewis had released the rocking The Session...Recorded in London with Great Artists earlier in the year, one listen to his new LP revealed that he had not turned his back on his country audience. He gives a moving performance on George Jones's "What My Woman Can't Do" and covers fellow pianist Leon Russell's lonely lament "My Cricket and Me."  The rollicking "I'm Left, You're Right, She's Gone" was released as a second single and but did not crack the Top 20.

Grand Ole Opry
The release of Sometimes a Memory Ain't Enough followed not long after Lewis's first ever appearance on the Grand Ole Opry on January 20, 1973. Although Lewis had scored 14 Top 10 country hits since 1968 (including four chart toppers), "the Killer" had never been asked to perform at the hallowed Opry. As Colin Escott notes in the liner notes to A Half Century of Hits, Lewis had always maintained ambivalent feelings towards Music City ever since he'd been turned away as an aspiring musician before his glory days at Sun Records: "It was 18 years since he had left Nashville broke and disheartened...But for all the success (65 country hits at last counting), Lewis was never truly accepted in Nashville. He didn’t move there and didn’t schmooze there. He didn’t fit in with the family values crowd. Lewis family values weren’t necessarily worse, but they were different."  When Lewis finally took the stage, he broke just about every rule the Opry had. As recounted in a 2015 online Rolling Stone article by Beville Dunkerley, Lewis opened with his comeback single "Another Place, Another Time" and then announced to the audience, "Let me tell ya something about Jerry Lee Lewis, ladies and gentlemen: I am a rock and rollin', country-and-western, rhythm and blues-singin' motherfucker!"  Ignoring his allotted time constraints - and, thus, commercial breaks - Lewis played for 40 minutes (the average Opry performance is two songs, for about eight maximum minutes of stage time) and invited Del Wood - the one member of the Opry who had been kind to him when he had been there as a teenager - out on stage to sing with him. He also blasted through "Whole Lotta Shakin' Going On," "Workin' Man Blues," "Good Golly Miss Molly," and a host of others classics before leaving the stage to a thunderous standing ovation.

Track listing

References 

1973 albums
Jerry Lee Lewis albums
Mercury Records albums